Acontista concinna is a species of praying mantis in the family Acanthopidae that is native to Ecuador.

See also
List of mantis genera and species

References

Acanthopidae
Mantodea of South America
Fauna of Ecuador
Insects described in 1833